Ronan (Ronnie) McCormack (born 27 April 1977) was a professional rugby union player from Ireland. He recently played provincial rugby for Leinster   and club rugby for University College Dublin RFC.

McCormack began his rugby career at St. Mary's College in Rathmines in Dublin, winning both Leinster Junior and Senior cup medals. He spent two years playing with Connacht and Ulster before returning to Leinster and UCD RFC.
He is a regular member of the UCD AIL Division One starting fifteen.

McCormack was called up to the senior Ireland squad for the 2005 Six Nations Championship.

McCormack announced his retirement in November 2010 due to a neck injury.

References

Leinster Profile
UCD Profile
Sky Profile

1977 births
Irish rugby union players
Connacht Rugby players
Ulster Rugby players
Leinster Rugby players
St Mary's College RFC players
University College Dublin R.F.C. players
Alumni of University College Dublin
Living people
People educated at St Mary's College, Dublin
Rugby union players from Dublin (city)
Rugby union props